S. amseli may refer to:

 Scopula amseli, a geometer moth
 Scrobipalpa amseli, a twirler moth
 Stagmatophora amseli, a cosmet moth
 Stenoptilia amseli, a plume moth